Zwolle Stadshagen is a railway station in Zwolle, Overijssel, Netherlands. It serves the Kamperlijntje between Zwolle and Kampen. The station was opened on 15 December 2019.

The station was originally planned to be opened in December 2017. It was discovered, however, that the renovation of the track was done with a technical error, and the trains could not go as fast as planned. In 2018, the technical issues were solved, and, after a short trial, the decision was made to open the station on 15 December 2019, when the new schedule of the Dutch Railways was enacted.

References

Railway stations in Overijssel
Railway stations opened in 2019
Buildings and structures in Zwolle